Distria Krasniqi  (born 10 December 1995) is a Kosovar judoka. She received a gold medal in the women's 48-kg judo competition at the 2020 Summer Olympics in Tokyo. In August 2021, she was awarded the Honor of the Nation Decoration of Albania by the President of Albania.

Life and career
She took up the sport at the age of seven and was encouraged by her brother with whom she practiced the sport.

In mid 2018, she later switched to the super lightweight category of 48 kilograms from 52 kg event after missing out on qualifying for the 2016 Summer Olympics. As a result, she avoided her fellow Kosovan teammate and 2016 Olympic champion Majlinda Kelmendi in the light weight division, as well as Nora Gjakova, the 2018 European light weight champion in the qualification round for the 2020 Olympic Games.

She won bronze medal in the 48 kg category at the 2019 World Judo Championships. In 2020, she won one of the bronze medals in the women's 48 kg event at the 2020 European Judo Championships held in Prague, Czech Republic. In 2021, she won the gold medal in her event at the 2021 Judo World Masters held in Doha, Qatar.

She represented Kosovo at the 2020 Summer Olympics held in Tokyo, Japan which also marked her debut appearance at the Olympics and claimed a gold medal in the women's 48kg event.

She won the Female Athlete of the Year award at the 2021 Judo Awards.

She won the silver medal in her event at the 2022 Judo Grand Slam Paris held in Paris, France. 
She won the gold medal in the women's 52 kg event at the 2022 Mediterranean Games held in Oran, Algeria.

References

External links

 
 

1995 births
European Games competitors for Kosovo
Judoka at the 2015 European Games
Judoka at the 2019 European Games
Judoka at the 2020 Summer Olympics
Kosovan female judoka
Kosovo Albanians
Living people
Medalists at the 2020 Summer Olympics
Mediterranean Games gold medalists for Kosovo
Mediterranean Games medalists in judo
Competitors at the 2018 Mediterranean Games
Competitors at the 2022 Mediterranean Games
Olympic judoka of Kosovo
Olympic gold medalists for Kosovo
Sportspeople from Peja
Olympic medalists in judo